Ahmadabad-e Sowlat (also Romanized as Aḩmadābād-e Şowlat; also known as Aḩmadābād, Aḩmadābād-e Pā’īn, and Ahmad Abad Pa’in) is a city in Dasht-e Jam Rural District, Bujgan District, Torbat-e Jam County, Razavi Khorasan Province, Iran. At the 2006 census, its population was 6,825, in 1,390 families.

See also 

 List of cities, towns and villages in Razavi Khorasan Province

References 

Populated places in Torbat-e Jam County
Cities in Razavi Khorasan Province